Kolasah may refer to:
 Kolasah, Kermanshah
 Kolasah, Kurdistan

See also
 Kulaseh (disambiguation)